Parliamentary elections were held in Cuba on 1 June 1946. The Partido Auténtico emerged as the largest party, with 30 of the 66 seats in the House of Representatives.

Results

References

Cuba
Parliamentary elections in Cuba
1946 in Cuba
June 1946 events in North America
Election and referendum articles with incomplete results